Frank Arthur Hyppolite Vanhecke (born 30 May 1959) is a Belgian politician. Vanhecke started his career in Belgian politics as a student by joining the Jong Studentenverbond and later the Nationalistische Studentenvereniging. He gave up his membership of the Volksunie in 1977 after it acceded to a much-debated package of federal reforms. Vanhecke subsequently joined the Vlaams Nationale Partij, the predecessor of the Vlaams Blok.

Quickly climbing the party ranks, he became responsible for the party's press and media communication in 1986 and worked from 1989 as a personal assistant to Karel Dillen in the European Parliament, until he was elected to a Parliamentary seat himself in 1994. After a short term in the Belgian Senate, Vanhecke returned to European politics after the elections in 2004.

Vanhecke sat on its Committee on Civil Liberties, Justice and Home Affairs, and is a substitute for the Committee on Development and a member of the
Delegation for relations with Switzerland, Iceland and Norway and to the European Economic Area (EEA) Joint Parliamentary Committee.  His voting record in the European Parliament shows his clear pro-life stance.

When Karel Dillen resigned from his post as chairman of the Vlaams Blok in 1996, Vanhecke was designated as his successor. He was elected in 2001.

In November 2004 the Vlaams Blok was dissolved and a new political party was created under the name Vlaams Belang. Vanhecke was appointed chairman of this new party, a role he performed until 2008.

Vanhecke left Vlaams Belang in 2011, one of several high profile members at the time to quit the party, and finished the remainder of his term as an MEP as an independent and joined the Europe of Freedom and Democracy group. He subsequently announced his support for the New Flemish Alliance party but was refused membership due to his political past.

Education
 1981: Degree in literature and philosophy - communication sciences

Career
 1996-2008: General Chairman of the Vlaams Blok
 1994-1996 and since 2000: Member of the Bruges City Council (group chairman)
 1994-2003 and since 2004: Member of the European Parliament
 2003-2004: Group leader in the Senate
 1989-1994: Deputy Secretary-General, Technical Group of the European Right

See also
 2004 European Parliament election in Belgium

References

External links
 MEP website of Frank Vanhecke
 
 

1959 births
Living people
Politicians from Bruges
People's Union (Belgium) politicians
Vlaams Belang MEPs
MEPs for Belgium 2004–2009
MEPs for Belgium 2009–2014